Rejoice! Musical Soul Food is a 24-hour music format independently and self-produced through Urban Choice Media. It draws an African American audience with a Gospel Music format from artists such as Marvin Sapp, Kirk Franklin, Clark Sisters, etc.

This satellite format was a property of ABC Music Radio until The Walt Disney Company sold it off in 2006 to Dallas-based Urban Choice Media.

Competitor networks
Singing News Radio by Salem Radio Networks (Salem Communications), which features Southern Gospel music rather than Urban Gospel.

External links  
Rejoice! Musical Soul Food - Official Website

Radio formats
American radio networks
Former subsidiaries of The Walt Disney Company 
Christian radio stations in the United States